Axelsberg (Axelhill) is a district of the Hägersten-Liljeholmen borough in Söderort, the southern suburban part of Stockholm. It is close to the Hägersten industrial area. The district's Metro station was opened in 1965.

Districts of Stockholm

de:Axelsberg (Stockholm Tunnelbana)
no:Axelsberg tunnelbanestasjon